Timon princeps, commonly called the Siirt lizard or the Zagrosian lizard, is a species of lizard in the family Lacertidae (wall lizards). The species is endemic to Western Asia.

Geographic range
Timon princeps is native to southwestern Iran (central Zagros Mountains near Shiraz), northern Iraq, northeastern Syria, and southeastern Turkey.

Reproduction
T. princeps is oviparous.

References

External links

Photos: multiple pictures

Further reading
Blanford WT (1874). "Descriptions of new Reptilia and Amphibia from Persia and Baluchistán". The Annals and Magazine of Natural History, Fourth Series 14: 31–35. (Lacerta princeps, new species, p. 31). (in English and Latin).
Blanford WT (1876). Eastern Persia: An Account of the Journeys of the Persian Boundary Commission 1870–71–72. Vol. II. Zoology and Geology. Published by the Authority of the Government of India. London: Macmillan and Co. viii + 516 pp. + Plates I-XXVIII. (Lacerta princeps, pp. 364-367 + Plate XXIV).
Boulenger GA (1887). Catalogue of the Lizards in the British Museum (Natural History). Second Edition. Volume III. Lacertidæ ... London: Trustees of the British Museum (Natural History). (Taylor and Francis, printers). xii + 575 pp. + Plates I-XL. (Lacerta princeps, pp. 18–19).
Mayer, Werner; Bischoff, Wolfgang (1996). "Beiträge zur taxonomischen Revision der Gattung Lacerta (Reptilia: Lacertidae). Tiel 1: Zootoca, Omanosaura, Timon und Teira als eigenständige Gattungen [Contributions to the taxonomic revision of the genus Lacerta (Reptilia: Lacertidae). Part 1: Zootoca, Omanosaura, Timon and Teira as full genera]". Salamandra 32 (3): 163–170. (Timon princeps, new combination, p. 169). (in German, with an abstract in English).

Timon (genus)
Reptiles described in 1874
Taxa named by William Thomas Blanford